Christopher Campbell Okey (born December 29, 1994) is an American professional baseball catcher who is currently a free agent. He made his MLB debut in 2022. He played college baseball for the Clemson Tigers of Clemson University.

Amateur career
Okey attended Eustis High School in Eustis, Florida. Playing for the school's baseball team, Okey was a four-year letterman. He also played for the United States national youth baseball team. In his senior year, Okey had a .411 batting average with four home runs and 29 runs batted in (RBIs). The San Diego Padres selected Okey in the 31st round of the 2013 Major League Baseball draft, but he did not sign.

Okey enrolled at Clemson University in order to play college baseball for the Clemson Tigers. He split time during his freshman year between catcher and designated hitter. As a freshman, Okey batted .248 with four home runs, and 41 RBIs in 61 games played. In 2015, his sophomore year, Okey started at catcher in all of the Tigers' 61 games, and had a .315 batting average and led the team with 12 home runs and 57 RBIs. He was named to the All-Atlantic Coast Conference team, an All-American, and a semifinalist for the Johnny Bench Award. In 2016, Baseball America rated Okey as the 25th-best college prospect available in the 2016 Major League Baseball draft. He was named a Preseason All-American before the 2016 season.

Professional career
The Cincinnati Reds selected Okey in the second round, with the 43rd overall selection, of the 2016 draft. Okey signed with the Reds, receiving a reported $2 million signing bonus, and made his professional debut with the Billings Mustangs of the Rookie-level Pioneer League. After playing in nine games for Billings, he was promoted to the Dayton Dragons of the Class A Midwest League. Okey finished the 2016 season with a .227 batting average, six home runs and 22 RBIs in 51 games.

Okey spent the 2017 season with the Daytona Tortugas of the Class A-Advanced Florida State League, posting a .185 batting average with three home runs, 28 RBIs, and a .514 OPS in 93 games. He began 2018 with Daytona before being promoted to the Pensacola Blue Wahoos of the Class AA Southern League. In 86 games between the two clubs, Okey slashed .199/.259/.315 with seven home runs and 29 RBIs. He split the 2019 with the Chattanooga Lookouts of the Class AA Southern League and the Louisville Bats of the Class AAA International League, batting .209 with seven home runs and 28 RBIs over 58 games. The Reds invited Okey to spring training as a non-roster player in 2020. After the cancellation of the 2020 season, Okey played for Louisville in 2021 and returned there in 2022. On June 4, 2022, while playing for Louisville, Okey hit for the cycle in an 11-3 victory over the Gwinnett Stripers. He became the 7th player in Bats history to do so.

The Reds promoted Okey to the major leagues on June 10, 2022, following an injury to regular catcher Tyler Stephenson. He made his major league debut that same day as a defensive substitute for Aramis Garcia in a 2-0 loss to the St. Louis Cardinals. On June 13, Okey collected his first career hit, slapping a single up the middle off of Arizona Diamondbacks starter Merrill Kelly.

The Reds optioned Okey back to Louisville on June 29 and designated him for assignment on July 5. He was released on August 13, 2022.

Personal life
Okey's father, Chuck, played college football at Presbyterian College. His mother, Kim, was a cheerleader for Clemson. He has two older brothers, Chase and Mitch.

References

External links

1994 births
Living people
People from Mount Dora, Florida
Baseball players from Florida
Major League Baseball catchers
Cincinnati Reds players
Clemson Tigers baseball players
Billings Mustangs players
Dayton Dragons players
Daytona Tortugas players
Pensacola Blue Wahoos players
Louisville Bats players